Spirit AeroSystems Holdings, based in Wichita, Kansas, United States, is the world's largest first-tier aerostructures manufacturer. The company builds several important pieces of Boeing aircraft, including the fuselage of the 737, portions of the 787 fuselage, and the cockpit section of the fuselage (referred to as "Section 41" by Boeing) of nearly all of its airliners. Spirit also produces fuselage sections and front wing spars for the Airbus A350. Spirit's main competition comes from Triumph Aerostructures - Vought Aircraft Division, Collins Aerospace, Leonardo, and Kawasaki Heavy Industries.

History

Spirit was formed when Boeing Commercial Airplanes sold its Wichita division to investment firm Onex Corporation in 2005.  Originally founded as Stearman Aircraft in 1927 before being acquired by the United Aircraft and Transport Corporation in 1929, it was retained as a subsidiary of Boeing following the breakup of UATC in 1934 before being transformed into the Wichita division of the Boeing Airplane Company in 1941.  The Wichita division was later responsible for the construction of several models of strategic bomber aircraft including the B-29 Superfortress, B-47 Stratojet, and B-52 Stratofortress.  During World War II, employment peak at the Boeing Wichita division was 29,795 in December 1943.  From 1957 to 1963, starting with the B-52D variant a total of 467 B-52 aircraft were built in Wichita.  Since the mid-1990s, the Wichita built B-52H models have been the only variant of the B-52 aircraft remaining in military service.

Boeing Defense, Space & Security retained its military business in Wichita, which lay on neighboring land, until Boeing sold most of those properties to Air Capital Flight Line. 

Spirit also includes North American Aviation's former Tulsa and McAlester facilities (both in Oklahoma), as well as additional facilities in Kinston, NC, Prestwick, Scotland, Saint-Nazaire, France, and Subang, Malaysia.

In June 2016, it was announced that Tom Gentile was named CEO, replacing Larry Lawson.

Acquisitions
On January 31, 2006, BAE Systems announced it had agreed to sell its aerostructures business, based at Glasgow Prestwick Airport and Samlesbury Aerodrome, to Spirit. The BAE unit, which was renamed Spirit AeroSystems (Europe) Ltd., is a major supplier to Raytheon (5%), Airbus (80%), and Boeing (15%). The transaction was completed on April 1, 2006. Spirit paid GBP 80 million for the business.

On October 31, 2019, Spirit acquired Bombardier Aviation's aerostructures activities and aftermarket services operations in Northern Ireland (Short Brothers) and Morocco, and its aerostructures maintenance, repair and overhaul (MRO) facility in Dallas, with the acquisition completing a year later in October of 2020. The deal gives Spirit a bigger place in Airbus' supply chain, in particular with the wings for the Airbus A220 that are produced in the Belfast plant.

Spirit AeroSystems

In 2010, 96% of Spirit's revenue came from its two largest customers: 85% of sales were from Boeing, 11% from Airbus.  In 2009 these two customers represented 96% of sales for Spirit as well.

After planning to take Spirit public, at initial public offering on November 21, 2006, the firm's stock rose 10% on the first day. In November 2006, Onex owned 58% of Spirit, which resulted in 92% of voting power, as its shares conferred "supervoting" power.  The chief architect of the Onex purchase of Spirit was Nigel S. Wright, who was later Chief of Staff for the Canadian Prime Minister until his resignation as part of an expense scandal. In August 2014 the Onex Group sold all of its remaining shares of Spirit. Over the course of the nine-year investment, the Onex Group received aggregate proceeds of approximately $3.2 billion on its initial $375 million investment.

Former House Majority Leader Richard Gephardt (D-MO) serves as a labor consultant for Spirit and sits on its board of directors.

Facilities

United States
 Wichita, Kansas (headquarters & manufacturing plant) (ex-Stearman/Boeing)
 Tulsa, Oklahoma (ex-North American/Rockwell/Boeing)
 Kinston, North Carolina (manufacturing plant at Global TransPark)
United Kingdom
 Belfast, Northern Ireland, United Kingdom (Short Brothers, ex-Bombardier)
 Samlesbury, England, United Kingdom (small office on BAE Systems site)
 Prestwick, Scotland, United Kingdom (ex-Scottish Aviation/BAe/BAE)
France
 Saint-Nazaire, France (manufacturing plant)
 Malaysia
 Subang, Malaysia (manufacturing plant)
 Russia
 Moscow, Russia (joint venture)

References

External links 

 "Spirit gets first shot at non-Boeing job", Wichita Business Journal, October 16, 2005
 "Spirit plans mega project with $1 billion investment and 1,000 more jobs in Wichita", The Wichita Eagle, December 6, 2017

2005 establishments in Kansas
Aircraft manufacturers of the United States
American companies established in 2005
Companies based in Wichita, Kansas
Companies listed on the New York Stock Exchange
Manufacturing companies based in Kansas
Manufacturing companies established in 2005
Onex Corporation